Basil Anthony Zempilas (born 30 July 1971) is an Australian television and radio presenter, sports commentator and politician based in Perth, Western Australia. Zempilas presented sport until 2022 on Seven News Perth, Monday to Thursday and from  January 2014 until 11 December 2020 co-hosted Perth radio station 6PR's breakfast program with Steve Mills. He is also a member of the Seven Network's AFL football commentary team. Zempilas has commentated on the Olympics and several other major sporting events, was formerly with radio station 92.9 in Perth and has previously been a co-host of Weekend Sunrise. In 2020, Zempilas was elected Lord Mayor of Perth.

Early life
Zempilas attended Floreat Park Primary School and Hale School in Perth; he attended Hale along with Liberal Party politician and lawyer Christian Porter. Zempilas graduated from Perth's Murdoch University in 1992 with a degree in Media Studies and Mass Communications.

Zempilas played for the West Perth Football Club playing as a ruckman and forward, but retired due to injury. Zempilas played 24 games in the West Australian Football League between 1990 and 1994, kicking 25 goals including kicking 5 in a semi final in 1993.

Media career
Zempilas began his career at the Seven Network in February 1994 as a cadet sports reporter. He was awarded "Best News Story" at the annual Western Australia Football Commission media awards for his coverage of the Melbourne Football Club being thrown out of a West Coast Eagles closed training session. In 1996, he was named the "Best Television Personality" at the same awards.

In 1996 Zempilas was promoted to weekend sports anchor on Seven News, a position he held until the end of 2001, when Seven lost the rights to broadcast AFL. In 1997 he commenced hosting a locally produced football show, Basil's Footy Show. He hosted the 1998 World Aquatics Championships in Perth and co-hosted the local television program Perth at Five with Yvette Mooney.

Zempilas has been involved with the Seven Network's coverage of the Olympic Games since the 2000 Sydney Olympics, where he co-hosted Tonight at the Games with Bruce Abernethy for the Western Australia and South Australia markets. At the 2002 Winter Olympics, Zempilas called Steven Bradbury's win in the 1000m speed skating; Australia's first Winter Olympic Gold medal. Zempilas provided rowing and basketball commentary at the 2004 Athens Olympic Games and represented Seven News at the 2005 World Aquatics Championships. In 2006 he began presenting the AFL segment on the Seven Network program Sportsworld with David Schwarz. He called the speed skating event at the 2006 Winter Olympics with Bradbury and also commentated on Rowing, Canoe/Kayak and Basketball at the 2008 Summer Olympics.

Zempilas is the senior sport presenter on Seven News Perth, and in the past has provided AFL commentary on radio station 1116 SEN into Melbourne. He was a co-host of the Lisa, Paul & Baz show on Perth's 92.9 but left in November 2013.  He joined Steve Mills to host the 6PR breakfast radio show in January 2014.

Since 2012, Zempilas has been part of the Seven Network's expanded AFL broadcast team. Between 2012 and 2016, he mainly called Saturday afternoon matches and occasionally some Friday night (if the match in this timeslot is played in Perth) and Sunday afternoon matches; in 2017, he called Saturday night matches and continued to call Thursday and Friday night matches played in Perth. In 2018, due to his Weekend Sunrise commitments, his football duties were reduced to calling only Friday and Saturday night matches played in Sydney, and some matches in Perth.

He was also a commentator for Seven's Australian Open tennis coverage and is the host of the annual Channel Seven Perth Telethon.

In March 2018, Zempilas was appointed co-host of Weekend Sunrise replacing Andrew O'Keefe after previously filling in as host of the show. In September 2019, Zempilas stepped down as regular host of Weekend Sunrise, citing a desire to spend more time with his family, however he still appears on the show intermittently as a summer and fill-in presenter whenever required. In October 2019, it was announced that Matt Doran would replace Zempilas on the show from October 12.

In October 2020, it was announced Zempilas and 6PR would part ways at the end of his contract in November, due to 6PR being owned by Nine Entertainment Co.

In December 2020, Zempilas finished up at 6PR, but the following week he was announced as host of Triple M Perth's breakfast program with Jenna Clarke and Xavier Ellis.

In February 2022, it was announced that Zempilas would scale back his duties with the Seven Network, stepping down from his role as sports presenter on Seven News Perth.

Political career
In January 2020, Zempilas announced that he was running to be the Lord Mayor of the City of Perth.  Zempilas said if successful in the election, he would step down from his role on 6PR, but continue working with Seven News. He has been criticised for using his media presence to promote himself as a candidate, and for his support by The West Australian, who is his employer. The Western Australian Electoral Commission warned Zempilas that his columns in The West Australian which he uses to promote himself for lord mayor must be authorised.

On 17 October 2020, Zempilas won the election, defeating six other candidates. Zempilas received 1,855 votes, or 29.44% of the vote with 41% turnout (thus polling 12.07% of eligible voters). Zempilas defeated his nearest rival, former Australian Broadcasting Corporation journalist Di Bain, by 284 votes.

On 19 October 2020, Zempilas was sworn in as Lord Mayor of Perth, stating, "It is a significant honour to be sworn-in as the 18th Lord Mayor of this great city. It is also a great responsibility and immensely humbling. It is with genuine anticipation I pledge to lead a collaborative, consultative approach to high quality government."

In December 2021, Zempilas indicated he will run for Perth mayor again in the next election, stating, "My intention right now is to run again in 2023... So three years – I feel a little short-changed, having won an election, typically that means four years... My intention is absolutely to run again. I love the role and I'd like to see a lot of the things that we've got started, I'd like to see them finished off."

In 2021, Zempilas was "mentioned as a potential Liberal party option for a Campbell Newman-like tilt at the next [Western Australia] state election in four years."

Controversies
In January 2007, Zempilas received a fine and a three-month suspension of his driver's licence after pleading guilty to drink driving.

In November 2019, Zempilas used his column in The West Australian to make comments about the homeless situation in Perth, vowing that if elected Lord Mayor of Perth, he would "clean up" the city from rough sleepers, stating, "I make no apologies for this, the homeless need to be moved out of the Hay and Murray street malls and the surrounding areas... Forcibly, if that's what it takes. I'm sick of being told by people who don't live and work in the city like I do that it's not that bad — actually, it's worse... The look, the smell, the language, the fights — it's disgusting. A blight on our city." These comments were considered to have displayed a lack of empathy and later became the subject of a guerilla artist installation in the city.

In March 2020, Zempilas conducted a television interview with former West Coast Eagles captain Ben Cousins, whose highly publicised post-football life was characterised by struggles with drug addiction and various run-ins with the law. The interview, which was broadcast by Channel 7 amid much publicity, was widely condemned. Veteran journalist Caroline Wilson described Zempilas as "beyond grubby" and "beyond demeaning" for his line of questioning of Cousins. Zempilas and Channel 7 defended the broadcast against accusations that it was exploitative of Cousins and the revelation that Cousins was paid for the interview.

Zempilas was criticised in 2020 for using his media presence to promote himself as a candidate during the Perth mayoral election campaign. After Zempilas revealed plans to rally a team of like-minded council hopefuls, including his cousin Gary Mitchell, for the City of Perth, he was accused by rival candidate Mark Gibson of "stacking" the council with friends and family to snatch a voting majority. Zempilas was also criticized for announcing a plan to raise council rates for landlords with vacant retail space; the Property Council of Perth responded by saying rent increases for struggling owners were "poor policy" and "hardly an incentive."

Following his appointment as Lord Mayor of Perth, Zempilas has been criticised for having a "very strong conflict of interest" with his ongoing media commitments.

In October 2020, less than two weeks after being sworn in as Lord Mayor of Perth, Zempilas made comments on his radio show that some considered transphobic. He said "If you've got a penis mate, you're a bloke. If you've got a vagina, you're a woman. Game over." The comments were widely denounced, and Zempilas apologised the next day. A subsequent online petition called upon West Australian Premier Mark McGowan to sack Zempilas; the petition received 11,500 signatures. In the wake of Zempilas' controversial comments, the electronics retailer Retravision withdrew its advertising from 6PR, the radio station Zempilas was affiliated with at the time, and a public protest against Zempilas was held in Perth. Zempilas was also confronted by Perth LGBTQ groups during his first council meeting as Lord Mayor. A joint open letter from TransFolk of WA and Pride WA stated,

Zempilas' comments also caused a push to move Western Australia's annual Pride parade, PrideFest, from Perth to the nearby City of Vincent.

In March 2021, Zempilas was publicly criticized on Twitter by ABC journalist Emma Wynne for comments he made towards Triple M co-host Jenna Clarke during their breakfast radio show. Zempilas defended his comments, which he said were taken out of context.

In September 2021, Zempilas was the master of ceremonies of the 2021 AFL Grand Final at Perth's Optus Stadium, the first AFL grand final played in Perth and the second consecutive grand final to be played outside Victoria. In the days leading up to the grand final, Zempilas suggested via Twitter that the crowd at the game should stand and applaud for one minute in recognition of the rest of the country's ongoing struggle against the COVID-19 pandemic. This suggestion drew widespread criticism online, with accusations of it being "tone deaf," "cringeworthy," and "patronising." In response to the backlash against his suggestion, Zempilas stated, "I realise it's been received in a mixed way, but let me tell you the intention is pure."

Zempilas subsequently drew public criticism for the manner in which he conducted the post-game ceremony. Zempilas broke tradition by announcing Christian Petracca's Norm Smith Medal win himself, rather than allowing presenter and 2006 winner Andrew Embley to do the honours. Zempilas later insisted that the Norm Smith presentation went as it was supposed to. However, Embley revealed on 3AW's Sportsday, "I said during the week a couple of times when people asked me who's going to win, I actually said Melbourne and Christian Petracca, so I felt like I was just ready, I wasn't going to muck this one up... I got up there and good old Basil just took over from me."

Zempilas also did not allow Simon Goodwin, the coach of the Melbourne Demons, to make a customary victory speech during the post-game ceremony. Goodwin walked onto the stage to receive his Jock McHale Medal from John Worsfold, embraced Demons captain Max Gawn, and looked to make his way to the microphone, but before he could speak, Zempilas invited Garry Lyon to the stage to present the premiership cup to Goodwin and Gawn. The other Melbourne Demons swarmed the stage after Goodwin and Gawn held the cup aloft. The following day, Goodwin admitted he had a speech prepared. Zempilas later apologised for denying Goodwin the chance to make his speech, describing the situation as "regrettable" and "disappointing." The CEO of the AFL, Gillon McLachlan, said, "It was a mistake. Mistakes happen; it was disappointing for Simon, but it was a mistake."

Personal life
In March 2004, a portrait of Zempilas by Perth artist Melinda Mackay was entered in the Archibald Prize, and in the same year he featured in Cleo's 50 Most Eligible Bachelors.

On 6 September 2009, Zempilas married his longtime girlfriend Amy Graham on the island of Kastellorizo, Greece. They have two daughters and a son.

References

External links
 Channel Seven Perth personality profiles
 
 

1971 births
Living people
Australian television journalists
Australian radio personalities
Seven News presenters
People educated at Hale School
West Perth Football Club players
Australian rules footballers from Western Australia
Australian people of Greek descent
Murdoch University alumni
Australian rules football commentators
Mayors and Lord Mayors of Perth, Western Australia